Qingnian Reservoir ( is a reservoir located in the town of Qingxi, Shaoshan, Hunan, China.

Etymology
The main builder of the reservoir is the hot-blooded youth of Shaoshan, so it is named "Qingnian Reservoir" (literally Youth Reservoir).

The reservoir provides drinking water and water for irrigation, and has also become a place for recreation for nearby residents and tourists.

History
Construction of the reservoir began on 28 October 1958 and was completed in a few years.

In 2009, it was listed among the ninth group "National Water Conservancy Scenic Area" by the Ministry of Water Resources of the People's Republic of China.

References 

Geography of Xiangtan
Shaoshan
Reservoirs in Hunan